Ryan Pagan (born 12 July 1977) is a former Australian rules footballer who played with North Melbourne in the Australian Football League (AFL) in 2000.

He is the son of North's coach at the time, Denis Pagan.

Ryan now runs a real-estate firm in the inner North West of Melbourne.

References

External links

Living people
1977 births
Australian rules footballers from Victoria (Australia)
North Melbourne Football Club players